Trochus stellatus, common name the stellate trochus, is a species of sea snail, a marine gastropod mollusk in the family Trochidae, the top snails. The species is now extinct.

Trochus incrassatus Lamarck, 1822 is considered a synonym of this species by the Australian Faunal Directory

Description
The size of this large, heavy, top-shaped shell varies between 18 mm and 40 mm. The shell has wrinkled plaits and concatenated dots. The sutures of the upper whorls are spinous and radiated. The shell has a yellow tint to it and has brown stripes. The inside of the shell is a glossy white. 

(Description as Trochus incrassatus) The height of the shell attains 30 mm, its diameter also 30 mm. The, thick, heavy, solid shell has a conical shape. It is, whitish, radiately striped above and below with purplish red. The outlines of the spire are convex. The 7 to 8 whorls are coarsely granulose in about 5 or 6 spiral series, of which the upper series is most prominent. The periphery is rounded. The base of the shell is a little concave, with about 7 concentric granulose or subgranulose lirae. The aperture is strongly lirate within upon the parietal and outer wall. The basal margin contains four or five teeth. The columella is dentate. The umbilical tract is nearly smooth or obsoletely spirally plicate.

Distribution
This marine species occurs off India, Sri Lanka,  the Philippines, Japan, Oceania, New Caledonia, and Australia (the Northern Territory, Queensland and Western Australia); also in the Indian Ocean off Madagascar.

References

 Gmelin, J.F. & Linnaeus, C. 1791. Caroli a Linné Systema Naturae per regna tria naturae, secundum classes, ordines, genera, species, cum characteribus, differentis, synonymis, locis. Editio decima tertia aucta, reformata. Lipsiae : G.E. Beer. 
 Röding, P.F. 1798. Museum Boltenianum sive Catalogus cimeliorum e tribus regnis naturae quae olim collegerat Joa. Hamburg : Trappii 199 pp.
 Lamarck, J.B. 1822. Histoire naturelle des Animaux sans Vertèbres. Paris : J.B. Lamarck Vol. 7 711 pp.
 Hedley, C. 1899. The Mollusca of Funafuti. Part 1. Gastropoda. Memoirs of the Australian Museum 3(7): 395-488, 49 text figs
 Schepman, M.M. 1908. Prosobranchia (excluding Heteropoda and parasitic Prosobranchia). Rhipidoglossa and Docoglossa. With an appendix by Prof. R. Bergh [Pectinobranchiata]. Siboga-Expéditie Report 49(1): 1-108, 9 pls
 Dautzenberg, Ph. (1929). Contribution à l'étude de la faune de Madagascar: Mollusca marina testacea. Faune des colonies françaises, III (fasc. 4). Société d'Editions géographiques, maritimes et coloniales: Paris. 321–636, plates IV-VII pp
 Winckworth, R. 1936. Marine mollusca from South India and Ceylon IV - X. Proceedings of the Malacological Society of London 22(1): 16-22
 Satyamurti, S.T. 1952. Mollusca of Krusadai Is. I. Amphineura and Gastropoda. Bulletin of the Madras Government Museum, Natural History ns 1(no. 2, pt 6): 267 pp., 34 pls
 Ladd, H.S. 1966. Chitons and gastropods (Haliotidae through Adeorbidae) from the western Pacific Islands. United States Geological Survey Professional Papers 531: 1-98 16 pls 
 Hinton, A. 1972. Shells of New Guinea and the Central Indo-Pacific. Milton : Jacaranda Press xviii 94 pp
 Rajagopal, A.S. & Mookherjee, H.P. 1978. Contributions to the molluscan fauna of India. Pt. I. Marine molluscs of the Coromandel Coast, Palk Strait and Gulf of Mannar - Gastropoda: Archaeogastropoda. Records of the Zoological Survey of India 12: 1-48
 Short, J.W. & Potter, D.G. 1987. Shells of Queensland and The Great Barrier Reef. Drummoyne, NSW : Golden press Pty Ltd 135 pp., 60 pl.
 Wilson, B. 1993. Australian Marine Shells. Prosobranch Gastropods. Kallaroo, Western Australia : Odyssey Publishing Vol. 1 408 pp.
 Sasaki, T. (2000) Family Trochidae. In: Okutani, T. (ed.), Marine Mollusks in Japan. Tokai University Press, Tokyo, 55-83 (in Japanese)

External links
 
 Great Barrier Reef Invertebrates: Trochus stellatus
 Atlas of Living Australia: Trochus stellaris

stellatus
Gastropods described in 1791